Said Boualam (born at Souk Ahras, French Algeria on 2 October 1906, died at Mas-Thibert, France on 8 February 1982) was a French politician and army officer. He was a colonel in the French Army, and the founder of the Front Algérie Française, a political and militant movement in favour of French Algeria.

He was elected a député during the Fifth Republic for Orléansville, for the party Regroupement national pour l'unité de la République (RNUR) in 1958. On 26 September 1959 he survived an attempted murder.

In 1960 he was responsible for the creation of the Front Algérie Française, which was banned by the French government after less than a year. After the group was disbanded he retired to France in 1962.

From 1958 to 1962, Boualam was four times elected vice-president of the National Assembly, becoming a symbol of pro-French Muslims.

Honours 
 Grand Officer of the Légion d’honneur (1978)
 Commander of the Légion d'honneur
 Croix de Guerre 1939-1945 
 Croix de la Valeur militaire
 Croix du Combattant

Footnotes

Works 
 Mon pays, la France, éd. France Empire, Paris, 1962
 Les Harkis au service de la France, éd. France Empire, Paris, 1963 
 L'Algérie sans la France, éd. France Empire, Paris, 1964

External links 
 Fiche sur Saïd Boualam par l'Assemblee nationale 

1906 births
1982 deaths
People from Souk Ahras
Algerian politicians
Deputies of the 1st National Assembly of the French Fifth Republic
French Army officers
People of the Algerian War
French people of Algerian descent
French Muslims
Migrants from French Algeria to France